The 1962–63 SK Rapid Wien season was the 65th season in club history.

Squad

Squad and statistics

Squad statistics

Fixtures and results

League

Cup

Inter-Cities Fairs Cup

References

1962-63 Rapid Wien Season
Rapid